Alphons Egli (8 October 1924 – 5 August 2016) was a Swiss politician and member of the Swiss Federal Council (1983–86). He was elected to the Federal Council of Switzerland on 8 December 1982 and handed over office on 31 December 1986. He was affiliated to the Christian Democratic People's Party of Switzerland. During his time in office he held the Federal Department of Home Affairs and was President of the Confederation in 1986. Egli was a citizen of Entlebuch and Lucerne. He died on 5 August 2016, aged 91.

References

External links 
 
 
 

Members of the Federal Council (Switzerland)
1924 births
2016 deaths
People from Lucerne
Swiss Roman Catholics
20th-century Swiss politicians
University of Bern alumni